A qutrub in Arabian folklore is a type of jinn or demon, likened to an "Arabian 'werewolf'", similar to a ghoul because it was said to haunt graveyards and eat corpses.

The qutrub also appear as monsters in the role-playing game Final Fantasy XI.

See also
 Cynocephaly
 Sila

References

Vana'diel Bestiary for Final Fantasy XI: Qutrub (Allakhazam.com)

Arabian legendary creatures
Jinn
Demons in Islam
Demons
Devils
Undead
Ghouls